This is a list of villages in Østfold, a county of Norway. For other counties see the lists of villages in Norway.

The list excludes cities located in Østfold.

References

External links

Ostfold